Prepona pylene, the narrow-banded shoemaker, is a butterfly of the family Nymphalidae. It was described by William Chapman Hewitson in 1853. It is found throughout the Amazonian region from Honduras to Paraguay. The habitat consists of rainforests at altitudes between 400 and 1,000 meters.

Subspecies
Prepona pylene pylene (Brazil: Rio de Janeiro, Santa Catarina, Espírito Santo, Rio Grande do Sul)
Prepona pylene bahiana Fruhstorfer, 1897 (Brazil: Bahia)
Prepona pylene eugenes Bates, 1865 (Bolivia, Ecuador, Colombia, Brazil: Pará)
Prepona pylene gnorima Bates, 1865 (Honduras to Colombia)
Prepona pylene jordani Fruhstorfer, 1905 (Ecuador)
Prepona pylene laertides Staudinger, 1898 (Bolivia, Paraguay, Brazil: Minas Gerais)
Prepona pylene philetas Fruhstorfer, 1904 (Honduras)

References

Butterflies described in 1853
Charaxinae
Fauna of Brazil
Nymphalidae of South America